Luyckx is a Dutch patronymic surname based on an archaic spelling of the given name Luuk/Luc, short forms of Lucas. The name has a myriad of spellings, each pronounced . While in Belgium Luyckx is by far the most common (3433 people in 2008), in the Netherlands the forms Luijkx, Luijks, Luijk, Luik and Luijckx are more prevalent. For some families the name may be toponymic instead, referring to an origin in Luik, the Dutch name of Liège. This is generally the case for forms like Van Luijk, Van Luik and de Luyck. People with these surnames include:

Albert Luykx (1919–?), Belgian Nazi collaborator who fled to Ireland
Alec Luyckx (born 1995), Belgian football midfielder
Bets Borm-Luijkx (1918–2015), Dutch CDA politician
Boniface Luykx (1915–2004), Belgian Norbertine priest and monastery founder
Carstian Luyckx (1623–c.1675), Flemish still life painter and draughtsman
Clifford Luyk (born 1941), Dutch-American born Spanish basketball player
 (1932–2007), Belgian painter
Frans Luycx (1604–1668), Flemish portrait painter
Kees Luijckx (born 1986), Dutch football defender
Luc Luycx (born 1958), Belgian designer of the common side of the euro coins
Marc Luyckx Ghisi (born 1942), Belgian philosopher and essayist
Maxime Luycx (born 1982), Belgian field hockey player
Patrick van Luijk (born 1984), Dutch sprinter
Peter Luykx (born 1964), Belgian New Flemish Alliance politician
Teun Luijkx (born 1986), Dutch film actor

See also
Luiken, Dutch surname of the same origin
Luik, Estonian surname

References

Dutch-language surnames
Patronymic surnames
Toponymic surnames